The Roman Catholic Diocese of Gizo is  a suffragan diocese of the Roman Catholic Archdiocese of Honiara. It was erected Vicariate Apostolic in 1959 from the Vicariates Apostolic of Northern Solomon Islands and Southern Solomon Islands. In 1966, it was elevated to a diocese and was renamed as the Diocese of Gizo. St. Peter's Cathedral at Gizo is the mother church for the diocese.

Bishops

Ordinaries
Eusebius John Crawford, O.P. (1960–1995) 
Bernard Cyril O'Grady, O.P. (1995–2007)
Luciano Capelli, S.D.B. (2007-)

Auxiliary bishop
Christopher Michael Cardone, O.P. (2001-2004), appointed Bishop of Auki

References

External links

Gizo
Gizo, Solomon Islands